Edward Graham Porteous (born 7 July 1994) is an English actor. He is known for his roles as Mark Fowler Jnr in the BBC soap opera EastEnders (2016) and Joe Tate in the ITV soap opera Emmerdale (2017–2018).

Early life
Porteous is from Buckinghamshire. He attended John Colet School in Wendover. He enrolled at Tring Park School for the Performing Arts before going on to graduate with a Bachelor of Arts in Acting from the Guildford School of Acting in 2015.

Career
Porteous made his acting debut during an episode of the BBC medical drama Holby City as Rufus Lucas on 15 September 2015. He then featured in a 13 Episode stint in the BBC soap EastEnders as Mark Fowler between 11 August and 9 September 2016. Despite Mark having been born and brought up in the United States, Porteous did not use an American accent for the role.

On 13 September 2017, he first appeared in the ITV soap opera Emmerdale as young businessman Tom Waterhouse, a name that turned out to be an alias, the character's real name being Joseph Tate. He received nominations at the National Television Awards and the British Soap Awards. He exited Emmerdale in October 2018. That same year, Porteous made his feature film debut in the horror film Astral.

Porteous played Lord Wetherby, Henry Granville's (Julian Ovenden) lover, in the first season of the 2020 Netflix period drama Bridgerton. He has an upcoming role in the Disney+ series Extraordinary.

Filmography

Awards and nominations

References

External links
 
 Ned Porteous at Independent Talent
 Ned Porteous on Instagram
 Ned Porteous on Twitter

Living people
1994 births
21st-century British male actors
Alumni of the Guildford School of Acting
British male film actors
British male television actors
English people of Scottish descent
Male actors from Buckinghamshire
People educated at Tring Park School for the Performing Arts
People from High Wycombe
People from Wendover
Place of birth missing (living people)